Carrie Cracknell (born 1980) is a British theatre director.  She was Artistic Director of the Gate Theatre, London from 2007–2012. She was Associate Director at both the Young Vic (2012–2013) and the Royal Court (2013–2014).

Background 

Cracknell was born in Carlisle and was raised in Oxford.  She read history at the University of Nottingham, where she was president of The Nottingham New Theatre. She later studied directing at the Royal Scottish Academy of Music and Drama in Glasgow.

Career 

At university she set up a production company called Hush with a group of friends including the actor Ruth Wilson.  Their first show transferred to New York and London while they were still studying. At the age of 26 Carrie became the youngest artistic director of a professional theatre in Britain when she and Natalie Abrahami took over The Gate Theatre in Notting Hill, which they ran for 5 years and where she directed extensively.
 
Her first dance/theatre collaboration at The Gate, I Am Falling, transferred to Sadler's Wells and was nominated for a South Bank Show Award. After leaving The Gate, Carrie went on to create her iconic production of A Doll's House which ran twice at the Young Vic before transferring to the Duke of York's in the West End and BAM in New York and for which she was nominated for the Evening Standard Best Director Award. It led to her developing the short film Nora with Nick Payne in response to the play which was produced by the Young Vic. She then went on to direct her first opera, Berg's Wozzeck, for the ENO at the Colliseum, which was nominated for an Olivier Award and an International Opera Award. In 2019 she directed Jake Gyllenhaal and Tom Sturridge in Seawall/A Life at The Public and on Broadway receiving four Tony nominations, for Best Play, Best Performance by an Actor in a Leading Role twice, for both Jake Gyllenhaal and Tom Sturridge, and Best Sound Design in a Play for Daniel Kluger.

Carrie now regularly collaborates with the National Theatre, where her credits include her acclaimed productions of Medea, A Deep Blue Sea (both with Helen McCrory and which were live-streamed into cinemas internationally as part of NT Live), Blurred Lines and Julie (starring Vanessa Kirby in a new version by Polly Stenham, also NT Live.) 
Other credits include Macbeth and Electra (Young Vic) Birdland and Pigeons (The Royal Court) Oil (The Almeida) A Doll's House and Stacy (National Theatre of Scotland.)

Theatre credits 

 Sea Wall/A Life - 2019 The Public Theatre, New York and The Hudson, New York
 Julie by Polly Stenham after Strindberg - 2018 National Theatre 
 Oil - 2016 (Almeida)
 The Deep Blue Sea - 2016 (National Theatre)
 Macbeth - 2015 (Young Vic)
 A Doll's House - 2014 (BAM) 
 Medea - 14 July - 4 September 2014 (National Theatre)
 Birdland - 2014 (Royal Court)
 Blurred Lines - 2014 (National Theatre)
 Searched – 2013 (Royal Court Rough Cuts)
 A Doll's House by Ibsen – 2012 (Young Vic)
 Electra – 2011 (Gate Theatre/Young Vic)
 Elektra – 2010 (Gate Theatre/Headlong)
 Breathing Irregular – 2009/2010 (Gate Theatre)
 A Doll's House by Ibsen – 2009 (National Theatre of Scotland)
 Hedda by Ibsen, adapted by Lucy Kirkwood and starring Cara Horgan – 2008 (Gate Theatre)
 I Am Falling – 2008 (Gate Theatre and Sadler's Wells) Nominated for Southbank Show Award
 Armageddon by Mark Ravenhill – 2008 (Gate Theatre)
 The Sexual Neuroses of Our Parents – 2007 (Gate Theatre)
 Death and the City – 2005 (Tron Theatre)
 Stacy by Jack Thorne – 2005 (Tron Theatre)
 Broken Road by Ryan Craig – 2005 (British Council Showcase, BAC) Fringe First Award
 A Mobile Thriller – 2004 (Traverse, BAC, Harbourfront Toronto, Bristol Old Vic, National Tour)
 The Hush – 2002 ( BAC, Ohio Theatre New York)
 Macbeth – 2002 (Lakeside Arts Centre, Nottingham)

Filmography

External links 
 Personal Website
 Agent's Website

References 

1980 births
Living people
British theatre directors
Women theatre directors
People from Carlisle, Cumbria
Alumni of the University of Nottingham
Alumni of the Royal Conservatoire of Scotland